The Proud Youth is a 1978 Hong Kong film loosely based on Louis Cha's novel The Smiling, Proud Wanderer. It was produced by the Shaw Brothers Studio, directed by Sun Chung and starred Wong Yue, Shih Szu, Michael Chan and Ling Yun.

Cast
Wong Yue as Nangong Song (renamed from Linghu Chong)
Michael Chan as Hao Jieying (renamed from Tian Boguang)
Shih Szu as Bai Yingying (renamed from Ren Yingying)
Stanley Fung as Luo Chaojun (renamed from Yue Buqun)
Wong Chung as Guardian Shi (renamed from Xiang Wentian)
Ling Yun as Shi Zhongying (renamed from Liu Zhengfeng)
Yau Chui-ling as Lan Fenghuang
Cheng Miu as Leng Ruojun (renamed from Zuo Lengshan)
Lau Wai-ling as Luo Shouyi (renamed from Yue Lingshan)
Chan Shen as Priest Zhishan (renamed from Taoist Tianmen)
Teresa Ha as Abbess Yixin (renamed from Abbess Dingyi)
Wong Ching-ho as Cui Lin
Ng Hong-sang as Lao Denuo
Chan Wai-ying as Huizhi
Chong Lee as Luo Yingzhi
Ku Feng as Master Bai (renamed from Ren Woxing)
Ding Ying as Guardian Shi's wife
Yue Wing as Gao Yun (renamed from Qu Yang)
Tin Ching as Sima Wuji (renamed from Dongfang Bubai)
Yeung Chi-hing as Bingji
Wang Han-chen as Shaolin abbot
Hung Ling-ling as Huixin
Chin Yuet-sang
Tang Tak-cheung
Alan Chui Chung-San
Yuen Wah
Tsang Choh-lam
Gam Yam
Yuen Bun
Wong Chi-ming
Hsu Hsia
Ban Yun-sang
Wong Pau-gei
Siu Yuk-lung
Chow Kin-ping
Lau Fong-sai
Wong Chi-keung
Yuen Cheung-yan
Lo Wai
Alan Chan
Law Keung
Yuen Shun-yi
Lee Hang
Kong Chuen
Ha Kwok-wing
Lai Yau-hing
Gam Tin-chue
Lam Ching-ying

External links

1978 films
Films based on works by Jin Yong
Hong Kong martial arts films
Shaw Brothers Studio films
Wuxia films
Works based on The Smiling, Proud Wanderer
Films based on Chinese novels
1970s Hong Kong films